Stone Bridge is an unincorporated community in southern Clarke County, Virginia.

Unincorporated communities in Clarke County, Virginia
Unincorporated communities in Virginia